Tonya Lynn Verbeek (born 14 August 1977) is a Canadian freestyle wrestler. Verbeek was the first woman to win a wrestling medal for Canada when she took silver in 2004, she added to that with a bronze at the 2008 Summer Olympics and a second silver at the 2012 Summer Olympics in London. She has also won two bronze and a silver at the world championships and has a bronze and silver from the Pan American Games and Commonwealth Games respectively.

Sports career
She was born in Grimsby, Ontario. She took up wrestling in grade eleven and was undefeated throughout high school in Beamsville, Ontario. She trains at Brock University in St. Catharines, Ontario, and is coached by Marty Calder.

She won a silver medal at the 2004 Summer Olympics in freestyle women's wrestling in the 55 kg category.

At the 2008 Summer Olympics, she won Canada's third medal overall, the third Canadian medal ever in women's wrestling, by winning a bronze. Verbeek won a silver medal at the 2011 world championships. She was undefeated in 2012 when she was named to the Canadian team for the 2012 Summer Olympics. On 9 August 2012,Verbeek defeated Geeta Phogat of India in her first round match.  Verbeek went on to win the silver medal in the Women's 55 kg freestyle category, being defeated by Saori Yoshida in the final.

Wrestling record

International results 
 2012 Olympic Games 2nd
 2008 Olympic Games 3
 2007 Olympic Trial 1
 2005 Senior World Championships 3
 2004 Olympic Games 2
 2004 Canada Cup 1
 2004 Austrian Ladies Open 1
 2004 Women's Olympic Qualifying Tournament – 1 6
 2004 Athens Pre-Olympic Test Event 3
 2003 NYAC Tournament 1
 2003 World Cup of Women's Wrestling 2
 2003 Pan American Games 2
 2003 Canada Cup 2
 2003 Gotzis Lady Open 2
 2003 Hans von Zons 1
 2003 Pan American Championships 1
 2003 Klippan 4
 2002 World Cup of Women's Wrestling 4
 2002 Poland Open 4
 2002 World University Championships 3
 2001 Gilbert Schuab (56 kg) 1
 2000 Canada Cup (56 kg) 4
 1995 Sunkist 4
 1995 Senior World Championships 5

Canadian National Championships
 2005 Senior National Championships 1
 2003 Senior National Championships 2
 2002 Senior National Championships 2
 2001 Senior National Championship (56 kg) 3
 2000 Senior National Championship (56 kg) 3
 1999 Senior National Championships (56 kg) 4
 1997 Junior National Championships (56 kg) 2
 1996 Senior National Championships 2
 1995 Senior National Championship 1
 1995 Espoir National Championships 1
 1994 Senior National Championship 2

See also
 Wrestling in Canada

References

External links

 Athlete bio on CBC.ca
 Canadian Amateur Wrestling Association
 Tonya Verbeek
 Ontario Amateur Wrestling Association
 Tonya Verbeek on Real Champions

1977 births
Brock Badgers wrestlers
Canadian people of Dutch descent
Canadian people of German descent
Canadian sportswomen
Canadian female sport wrestlers
Commonwealth Games silver medallists for Canada
Living people
Olympic bronze medalists for Canada
Olympic silver medalists for Canada
Pan American Games bronze medalists for Canada
Pan American Games silver medalists for Canada
People from Grimsby, Ontario
Olympic medalists in wrestling
Olympic wrestlers of Canada
Sportspeople from Ontario
Wrestlers at the 2004 Summer Olympics
Wrestlers at the 2007 Pan American Games
Wrestlers at the 2008 Summer Olympics
Wrestlers at the 2010 Commonwealth Games
Wrestlers at the 2011 Pan American Games
Wrestlers at the 2012 Summer Olympics
Medalists at the 2012 Summer Olympics
Medalists at the 2008 Summer Olympics
Medalists at the 2004 Summer Olympics
World Wrestling Championships medalists
Commonwealth Games medallists in wrestling
Pan American Games medalists in wrestling
Universiade medalists in wrestling
Universiade silver medalists for Canada
Medalists at the 2005 Summer Universiade
Medalists at the 2007 Pan American Games
Medalists at the 2011 Pan American Games
Medallists at the 2010 Commonwealth Games